Darnall Old Ground at Darnall, Sheffield was a first-class cricket venue in the 1820s.  It was the home ground of Sheffield Cricket Club which played first-class matches there before relocating to Darnall New Ground.

References

1822 establishments in England
Cricket grounds in South Yorkshire
Cricket in South Yorkshire
Defunct cricket grounds in England
Defunct sports venues in South Yorkshire
English cricket in the 19th century
History of South Yorkshire
South Yorkshire
Sport in South Yorkshire
Sports venues in South Yorkshire